The 2019 South American U-20 Championship is an international association football tournament held in Chile. The ten national teams involved in the tournament were required to register a squad of 23 players; only players in these squads are eligible to take part in the tournament.Each player had to have been born after 1 January 1999. All ages as of start of the tournament.

Players name marked in bold have been capped at full international level.

Group A

Bolivia
Head coach:  Sixto Vizuete

The final squad was announced on 2 January 2019.

Brazil
Head coach: Carlos Amadeu

The final squad was announced on 13 December 2018. Alan Souza withdrew injured and was replaced by Tetê on 5 January 2019.

Chile
Head coach: Héctor Robles

The final squad was announced on 21 December 2018. Nicolás Guerra withdrew injured and was replaced by Diego Valencia on 15 January 2019.

Colombia
Head coach: Arturo Reyes

The final squad was announced on 2 January 2019. Juan Sebastián Palma was ruled out after suffering an injury and was replaced by Klíver Moreno on 15 January 2019.

Venezuela
Head coach: Rafael Dudamel

The final squad was announced on 12 January 2019.

Group B

Argentina
Head coach: Fernando Batista

The final squad was announced on 22 December 2018. Ezequiel Barco and Agustín Almendra were ruled out after suffering injuries. They were replaced by Gonzalo Maroni and Julián López respectively.

Ecuador
Head coach:  Jorge Célico

The final squad was announced on 2 January 2019.

Paraguay
Head coach: Gustavo Morínigo

The final squad was announced on 21 December 2018.

Peru
Head coach:  Daniel Ahmed

The final squad was announced on 12 January 2019.

Uruguay
Head coach: Fabián Coito

The final squad was announced on 19 December 2018.

References

South American U-20 Championship squads